The 1955 season of the Paraguayan Primera División, the top category of Paraguayan football, was played by 9 teams. The national champions were Libertad.

Results

First stage

Second stage

Aggregate Table

External links
Paraguay 1955 season at RSSSF

Para
Primera
Paraguayan Primera División seasons